Stephen Bradley Wilkerson (born June 1, 1977) is an American former professional baseball outfielder and first baseman in Major League Baseball (MLB) for eight seasons. He is the assistant hitting coach for the New York Yankees of MLB.

Wilkerson played college baseball for the University of Florida, and was selected by the Montreal Expos in the first round of the 1998 MLB draft. During his major league career, Wilkerson played for the Montreal Expos / Washington Nationals, Boston Red Sox, Texas Rangers, Seattle Mariners, and Toronto Blue Jays.

Early years 

Wilkerson was born in Owensboro, Kentucky, where he attended and played baseball at Apollo High School.  Wilkerson played for the US national junior baseball team in 1995. He was the most valuable player (MVP) of the World Junior Baseball Championship, pitching a three-hit shutout against Taiwan in the gold medal game, hitting .360, and leading Team USA with three home runs and eight runs batted in (RBI) for the tournament.

College career 

A line drive hitter and versatile defensive player, Wilkerson received an athletic scholarship to attend the University of Florida in Gainesville, Florida, where he played for coach Andy Lopez's Florida Gators baseball team from 1996 to 1998.  A three-time first-team All-American, Wilkerson led the Gators to the College World Series in 1996 and 1998 with both his hitting and pitching.  In the 1996 College World Series, he hit a dramatic grand slam to defeat the rival Florida State Seminoles.

As a junior in 1998, he became the first player in college history to hit 20 home runs, steal 20 bases, and win 10 games as a pitcher in the same year.  The Gators advanced to the 1998 College World Series, and he was awarded the Rotary Smith Award as the most outstanding player in college baseball.

The pitcher-outfielder holds a number of season and career school records, including career batting average (.381), career slugging percentage (.714), and career on-base percentage (.531).

Wilkerson was inducted into the University of Florida Athletic Hall of Fame as a "Gator Great" in 2010, and the National College Baseball Hall of Fame in 2012.  In 2014, he received his bachelor's degree in sport management from the University of Florida.

Professional career

Minor leagues 
The Montreal Expos selected Wilkerson in the first round, with the 33rd overall selection, of the 1998 Major League Baseball draft. Initially, he struggled in the minors. In , Wilkerson hit .235 with eight home runs and 49 RBI at Double-A Harrisburg. Back in the Eastern League to start the  season, Wilkerson tore up the league, hitting .336 with six home runs, 44 RBI and 36 doubles in 66 games. He was on pace to break the Eastern League record for doubles in a season before he was promoted to Triple-A Ottawa, of the International League. For the season, Wilkerson played in 129 games combined between Harrisburg and Ottawa, batting .295 with 18 home runs, 79 RBIs, and 47 doubles in 441 at-bats.

While coming up through the minors, Wilkerson was a member of the gold medal-winning USA baseball team in the Sydney Olympics. In one of the biggest upsets in Olympic history, Team USA defeated Cuba 4–0 in the Gold Medal Game.

Major Leagues 

Wilkerson debuted with Montreal on July 12,  against the Tampa Bay Devil Rays, finishing the game 0-for-3 with a walk. He recorded his first major league hit off Tim Wakefield of the Boston Red Sox on July 17, 2001, and his first major league home run off Atlanta Braves pitcher Jason Marquis on July 26, 2001.

From –, Wilkerson delivered almost identical seasons with a .266 average, 20 home runs and 59 RBI in 2002, and a .268 average, 19 home runs, and 77 RBI in 2003. In 2002, Wilkerson's 20 home runs set an Expos rookie record, and he was named Rookie of the Year by The Sporting News. He hit for the cycle on June 24, 2003, against Pittsburgh (with the Expos). In that first instance, Wilkerson became the first player since  to have the minimum four plate appearances and hit for a natural cycle.

In 2004, he hit the last home run in Montreal Expos franchise history. He appeared once more in an Expos uniform during the Major League Baseball Japan All-Star Series shortly after the 2004 regular season. The Expos were to become the Washington Nationals for the  season, prompting some to refer to Wilkerson as "The Last Expo."

Wilkerson opened the 2005 season as the regular center fielder and leadoff hitter after the Expos moved to Washington and became the Nationals. He hit for the cycle for the second time on April 6, 2005, against Philadelphia (with the Nationals, in their second game after moving from Montreal).  Wilkerson also hit the first grand slam home run hit by a Washington Nationals player.

On December 7, 2005, Wilkerson was traded to the Texas Rangers along with outfielder Terrmel Sledge and minor league pitching prospect Armando Galarraga for second baseman Alfonso Soriano. An injury to, and later the trade of, Mark Teixeira led to Wilkerson making many of his starts at first base in 2007.

On January 31, Wilkerson signed a one-year, $3 million contract with the Seattle Mariners. On April 30, he was designated for assignment, and on May 8 was given his unconditional release. On May 9, he signed with the Toronto Blue Jays. On August 22, he was put on the 15-day injured list with lower back spasms.  On October 30, 2008, Wilkerson filed for free-agency from Toronto.

On February 16, Wilkerson signed a minor league contract with an invitation to spring training with the Boston Red Sox.

Wilkerson decided to retire in 2009, having had one hit in nine Triple-A at-bats in the Boston minor league affiliate. He retired with a .247 batting average, .350 on-base percentage and 122 career home runs.

On February 23, 2010, Wilkerson attempted a brief comeback by agreeing to a minor league contract with the Philadelphia Phillies. However, he was released on March 29.

Coaching career 

In 2014, Wilkerson agreed to manage a middle school baseball team at The King's Academy in West Palm Beach, Florida, leading the team to a league championship in his first year. After the season, Wilkerson was hired as the school's varsity baseball coach.

Wilkerson is also a coach for USA Baseball. In 2014, he was named Volunteer Coach of the Year by the organization.

On July 17, 2020, Wilkerson was hired by Jacksonville University as a baseball assistant. On January 30, 2023, the New York Yankees hired Wilkerson as their assistant hitting coach.

Personal life 

Wilkerson married Dana Marie Gleason in 2006. They have three children—Ella, Ava and Max. In 2006, he was named a Kentucky Colonel by Governor Ernie Fletcher, the highest honor of the Commonwealth of Kentucky.

Wilkerson participated in numerous charitable functions over the course of his Major League career and he continues to do so post-retirement.  He holds a charity golf tournament annually to raise money for various children's charities.

See also 

 1997 College Baseball All-America Team
 1998 College Baseball All-America Team
 List of Major League Baseball players to hit for the cycle
 List of Florida Gators baseball players in Major League Baseball
 List of Olympic medalists in baseball
 List of University of Florida Olympians
List of University of Florida Athletic Hall of Fame members
 National College Baseball Hall of Fame

References

External links 

1977 births
Living people
All-American college baseball players
American expatriate baseball players in Canada
Baseball players at the 2000 Summer Olympics
Baseball players from Kentucky
National College Baseball Hall of Fame inductees
Dunedin Blue Jays players
Florida Gators baseball players
Frisco RoughRiders players
Harrisburg Senators players
Jupiter Hammerheads players
Major League Baseball first basemen
Major League Baseball left fielders
Major League Baseball right fielders
Medalists at the 2000 Summer Olympics
Montreal Expos players
Olympic gold medalists for the United States in baseball
Ottawa Lynx players
Pawtucket Red Sox players
Sportspeople from Owensboro, Kentucky
Seattle Mariners players
Texas Rangers players
Toronto Blue Jays players
Washington Nationals players
Jacksonville Dolphins baseball coaches